Hernani Club Rugby Elkartea is a Spanish rugby union club. The club currently competes in the División de Honor competition, the 1st level of Spanish club rugby. The club are based in the province of Gipuzkoa, in the autonomous community of Basque Country, northern Spain. Hernani play in white, green and red colours.

Honours
 Spanish championship: 0
Runners-up: 1979–80, 1980–81, 1981–82, 1983–84
 Copa FER: 1
Champions: 1978

Season by season

11 seasons in División de Honor

Squad 2012–13

See also
 Rugby union in Spain

External links
 Official website
 Spanish Rugby website

Rugby union teams in the Basque Country (autonomous community)
Rugby clubs established in 1965
Sport in Gipuzkoa
1965 establishments in Spain